Gary Spedding (born 15 August 1968) is an English retired professional darts player, who played in Professional Darts Corporation events.

Career
Spedding played in one BDO World Darts Championships in 2000, losing 3-0 to Steve Douglas and played in one PDC World Darts Championships in 2001, losing 3-1 to John Lowe.

World Championship performances

BDO
 2000: Last 32: (lost to Steve Douglas 0–3)

PDC
 2001: Last 32: (lost to John Lowe 1–3)

References

External links

1968 births
Living people
English darts players
Professional Darts Corporation former pro tour players